Andrew Michael Scott (born 27 June 1975) is an English former professional footballer who played as a full back. He made nineteen appearances in the Football League during spells with Cardiff City and Rochdale.

References

1975 births
Living people
English footballers
Footballers from Manchester
Blackburn Rovers F.C. players
Cardiff City F.C. players
Rochdale A.F.C. players
English Football League players
Association football fullbacks